Liviu Damian (13 March 1935, Corlăteni, Bălți, România — 20 July 1986, Chişinău, Moldavian SSR, USSR) was an author, essayist, journalist, poet, cultural person, Romanian writer and translator from the Republic of Moldova, a representative of the generation of the 1960s.

A street in Durlești, Chișinău, is named after him, as well as the Liviu Damian lyceum in Rîșcani.

Works
Darul fecioarei (1963)
Sunt verb (1968)
Partea noastră de zbor (1974)
De-a Baba-Oarba (1977)
Mândrie şi răbdare (1977)
Altoi pe o tulpină vorbitoare (1978)
Salcâmul din prag (1979)
Inima şi tunetul (1981)
Coroana de umbră (1982)
Scrieri alese, I, II (1985)
Poezii şi poeme (1986)

External links 
 Liviu DAMIAN

References

1935 births
1986 deaths
Moldovan writers
Moldovan male writers
People from Rîșcani District